Hartmann von Aue, also known as Hartmann von Ouwe, (born c. 1160–70, died c. 1210–20) was a German knight and poet. With his works including Erec, Iwein, Gregorius, and Der arme Heinrich, he introduced the Arthurian romance into German literature and, with Wolfram von Eschenbach and Gottfried von Strassburg, was one of the three great epic poets of Middle High German literature.

Life
Hartmann belonged to the lower nobility of Swabia, where he was born. After receiving a monastic education, he became retainer (Dienstmann) of a nobleman whose domain, Aue, has been identified with Obernau on the River Neckar. He also took part in the Crusade of 1197. The date of his death is as uncertain as that of his birth; he is mentioned in Gottfried von Strassburg's Tristan (c. 1210) as still alive, and in the Crône of Heinrich von dem Türlin, written about 1220, he is mourned for as dead.

Works
Hartmann produced four narrative poems which are of importance for the evolution of the Middle High German court epic. The first of these, Erec, which may have been written as early as 1191 or 1192, and the last, Iwein, belong to the Arthurian cycle and are based on epics by Chrétien de Troyes (Erec and Enide and Yvain, the Knight of the Lion, respectively). While the story of Chretien's Yvain refers to events in Chretien's Lancelot, to explain that Arthur is not present to help because Guinevere has been kidnapped, Hartmann did not adapt Chretien's Lancelot. The result is that Hartmann's Erec introduces entirely different explanations for Guinevere's kidnapping, which do not correspond to what occurred in the shared literary tradition of Chretien's Arthurian romances.

His other two narrative poems are Gregorius, also an adaptation of a French epic, and Der arme Heinrich, which tells the story of a leper cured by a young girl who is willing to sacrifice her life for him. The source of this tale evidently came from the lore of the noble family whom Hartmann served. Gregorius, Der arme Heinrich and Hartmann's lyrics, which are all fervidly religious in tone, imply a tendency towards asceticism, but, on the whole, Hartmann's striving seems rather to have been to reconcile the extremes of life; to establish a middle way of human conduct between the worldly pursuits of knighthood and the ascetic ideals of medieval religion. Translations have been made into modern German of all Hartmann's poems, while Der arme Heinrich has repeatedly attracted the attention of modern poets, both English (Longfellow, Rossetti) and German (notably, Gerhart Hauptmann).

He was also a Minnesänger, and 18 of his songs survive.

Editions and translations
Tobin, Frank, Kim Vivian, and Richard H. Lawson, trans. Arthurian Romances, Tales, and Lyric Poetry: The Complete Works of Hartmann von Aue, Penn State Press, 2001 
 Hartmann Von Aue, "Iwein: The Knight with the Lion", translated by J.W. Thomas, 1979, .
 Hartmann Von Aue, "Erec," translated by J.W. Thomas, 2001, .

References

External links 
 
Roy Boggs and Kurt Gärtner: Hartmann von Aue (Knowledge Base) Portal 

12th-century births
12th-century German poets
13th-century German poets
1210s deaths
Medieval German writers
Middle High German literature
Minnesingers
Writers of Arthurian literature
German male poets